Arthur de Montauban (died March 9, 1479), French magistrate and prelate, belonged to one of the great families of Brittany.

To satisfy a private grudge against Gilles, brother of Francis I, Duke of Brittany, he intrigued to such good purpose that Gilles was arrested for treason, and finally executed in prison in 1450. When Montauban's duplicity was discovered he was deprived of his office of bailli of Cotentin and banished.

He then became a monk, and through the support of his brother, John de Montauban (1412–1466), Louis XI's favourite, obtained the archbishopric of Bordeaux in 1468. He died in Paris on 9 March 1479.

Notes

References

Further reading

1479 deaths
15th-century Roman Catholic archbishops in France
Archbishops of Bordeaux
Year of birth unknown